Gary Hibbert (born 1963), is a male former cyclist who competed for England.

Athletics career
Hibbert was the 1994 National Champion after winning the British National Track Championships sprint title. He represented England in the 1,000 metres sprint event, at the 1994 Commonwealth Games in Victoria, British Columbia, Canada.

References

1963 births
Living people
English male cyclists
Cyclists at the 1994 Commonwealth Games
Commonwealth Games competitors for England